Thumb twiddling is an activity that is done with the hands of an individual whereby the fingers are interlocked and the thumbs circle around a common point, usually in the middle of the distance between the two thumbs.

While it is an expression of at least a moderate amount of manual dexterity, thumb twiddling is frequently used as an example of a useless, time-wasting activity.

Medical uses
Thumb twiddling can be used as a simple test for manual dexterity.

Contra-rotating thumbs 
Contra-rotation involves moving the thumbs in opposing directions. While thumb twiddling comes naturally for almost everyone, it is extremely rare for people to be able to naturally contra-rotate their thumbs without spending a significant amount of time training the new technique. Typically, a person will get through a half rotation before both of the thumbs will inexplicably synchronize directions. A similar phenomenon occurs using similar finger or arm movements.

See also
Thumb wrestling

References

Hand games